Andrés Manuel Santiago (born October 26, 1989) is a professional baseball pitcher who is a free agent. 

He was drafted by the Los Angeles Dodgers in the 2007 MLB draft for a signing bonus of $1.2 million dollars.  He spent his first seasons in the rookie leagues, playing in the Gulf Coast League and later the Arizona League. In 2011, he was promoted to the California League with  Rancho Cucamonga Quakes next year Santiago was promoted to the AA Chattanooga Lookouts in (2012).

He played for the Puerto Rican National Team in the 2013 World Baseball Classic.

Santiago played in 2 Pan American Games (2011 México and 2015 Toronto), a World Cup (2011 Panama), 5 Caribbean Series for Puerto Rico (2013, 2015, 2016, 2017, 2018), Premier12 (2015 Japan, Taiwan, Taipei)
. Santiago  pitched a no-hitter for the Lookouts against the Tennessee Smokies on August 28, 2014 in the Southern League . 

Santiago beat Italy in 2015 Premier12 tournament in Taiwan tossing 7 scoreless  innings striking out 6 to give Puerto Rico the first win of the tournament. Santiago later pitch  of work against Chinese Taipei giving up just a solo shot for the only run of his outing while striking 5 batters to help Puerto Rico advance to the quarterfinals.

Santiago signed a minor league deal with the Chicago Cubs on January 10, 2015. He was assigned to AA Tennessee and a month later was called up to AAA (Iowa Cubs) where he went 0–0 with 0.00 ERA in 5.1 innings of work as a reliever.

References

 http://www.truebluela.com/2014/8/28/6081045/andres-santiago-no-hitter-chattanooga-lookouts-dodgers

External links

1989 births
Living people
Gulf Coast Dodgers players
Arizona League Dodgers players
Lobos de Arecibo players
Gigantes de Carolina players
Criollos de Caguas players
Rancho Cucamonga Quakes players
Chattanooga Lookouts players
Mesa Solar Sox players
2013 World Baseball Classic players
2017 World Baseball Classic players
Puerto Rican baseball players
People from Cataño, Puerto Rico
Tennessee Smokies players
Iowa Cubs players
Cangrejeros de Santurce (baseball) players
Sussex County Miners players
New Jersey Jackals players
Florida Fire Frogs players
Baseball players at the 2015 Pan American Games
Pan American Games competitors for Puerto Rico
Liga de Béisbol Profesional Roberto Clemente pitchers